Ruda Kozielska  is a village in the administrative district of Gmina Kuźnia Raciborska, within Racibórz County, Silesian Voivodeship, in southern Poland.

References

Ruda Kozielska